Dili Municipality is one of the 14 municipalities, formerly districts, of Timor-Leste, and includes the national capital Dili. The municipality had a population of 277,279 , most of whom live in the capital city.

Etymology
Several explanations have been proffered for the origin of the municipality's name. It is often explained, including by the municipality's own website, as being derived from the Tetum word , which means pawpaw. According to Australian linguist, ethnologist and historian Geoffrey Hull, however, that explanation is phonologically and historically implausible, as the language spoken in the area now known as Dili before the Portuguese established their seat of administration there in 1769 was Mambai, not Tetum. Hull describes such explanations as "folk etymology".

In Hull's view, the word Dili appears to be cognate with the Bunak word zili, a reference to the escarpment behind the city; he comments that a Papuan language, of which Bunak is an example, was spoken in the Dili area before the spread of the Austronesian-based Mambai and Tetum languages.

Another "folk etymology" explanation suggested by the municipality is that its name is derived from the Portuguese word , which, in turn, is an approximation of the Tetum expression . Every year, the local community held a traditional dance ceremony, and also offered sacrifices for the hemp tree. The local people believed that the Portuguese word  meant 'sacred eye', and so they adopted it as the area's name.

Geography

It also has the highest population. It lies on the north coast of the island of Timor facing Ombai Strait, and borders the municipalities of Manatuto to the east, Aileu to the south, and Liquiçá to the west.

Atauro Island, to the north of the municipality opposite the capital, was one of Dili's administrative posts until the end of 2021, when it became a separate municipality.

Dili is the economic and political centre of East Timor.

Administrative posts 
The municipality's administrative posts (formerly sub-districts) are:

 Cristo Rei
 Dom Aleixo
 Metinaro
 Nain Feto; and
 Vera Cruz

The administrative posts are divided into 31 sucos ("villages") in total.

References

Notes

Bibliography

External links

  – official site (in Tetum with some content in English)
  – information page on Ministry of State Administration site 

 
Municipalities of East Timor